Svitavy District (Czech: okres Svitavy; German: Bezirk Zwittau) is a district (okres) within Pardubice Region of the Czech Republic. Its capital is the town of Svitavy. As a part of Pardubice Region the district has borders with Ústí nad Orlicí District to the north and Chrudim District to the west. The district was administratively formed in 1960, when the former districts of Litomyšl, Moravská Třebová, Polička and Svitavy were merged.

Svitavy District incorporates parts of historical regions of Bohemia and Moravia. From a total of 116 municipalities, 44 municipalities (including the district's capital) are situated in Moravia. As of 1 January 2007, 48,864 inhabitants live in the Moravian part of the district. The Bohemian part counted 67 municipalities with 50,885 inhabitants. Five municipalities (Brněnec, Březová nad Svitavou, Kamenná Horka, Karle and Radiměř altogether having 4,769 inhabitants) lie in Bohemia as well as Moravia.

Geography
With a total area of 1,379 km² it is the largest district of the Pardubice Region. From the total area of the district, agricultural land occupies 835.1 km² (arable land 628,8 km², permanent pastures 171.3 km² and water bodies 10.8 km²). Forests cover 31.3% of the district's area.

The district is divided into drainage basins of the Elbe and the Danube. The main rivers in the district are Svitava (central part of the district), Svratka (south-eastern part), Třebůvka (eastern part), Třebovka and Loučná (both in the north-western part). The former three rivers comprise part of the Danube basin, while the latter two comprise part of the Elbe basin. The largest water body in Svitavy District is the pond Hvězda, with an area of 82 ha.

Demography
As of 31 December 2012, the district had 104,971 inhabitants from which 53,120 were women and 51,851 were men. The average age was 40.9 years; 15.3% of the inhabitants were 14 years or younger, while 16.5% were 65 years or older. The district's workforce counted 53,955 people.

Climate
The district has a continental climate which is characterised by significant variations in temperature in the course of the year. There are slight variations between the climate in various parts of the district. The northwestern and southeastern part of the district have an average temperature of 7 °C and precipitation up to 600 mm in one year. The central part of the district is slightly cooler and more humid, with an average temperature of 6 °C and precipitation of 700 mm. The southeastern part of the district is even cooler and even more humid.

Economy
The district has been suffering from the highest unemployment rate in the Pardubice region, reaching 8.6% at the end of 2012.

The economy of the district is oriented towards agriculture and manufacturing. The share of the district's employment accounted for by agriculture has been steadily decreasing, yet it is still higher than in other districts of the Pardubice Region. The agricultural sector mainly produces cereals and rapeseed.

There is a relatively varied structure of manufacturing in the Svitavy district. Food and textile production comprise the main volume of manufacturing. However, the long-term importance of textile manufacturing is decreasing. Glass fibre production, metalworking and mechanical engineering are other important branches of manufacturing in the district.

Places of interest
 Hřebeč mining paths and museums
 Litomyšl with its château complex which is listed as a UNESCO World Heritage Site
 Renaissance historical core of Moravská Třebová
 Polička with its town walls
 Svojanov Castle
 Toulovcovy maštale, nature reserve with a labyrinth of sandstone rocks
 Protected Landscape Area Žďárské vrchy

List of municipalities

 Banín
 Bělá nad Svitavou
 Bělá u Jevíčka
 Benátky
 Bezděčí u Trnávky
 Biskupice
 Bohuňov
 Bohuňovice
 Borová
 Borušov
 Březina
 Březinky
 Březiny
 Březová nad Svitavou
 Brněnec
 Budislav
 Bystré
 Cerekvice nad Loučnou
 Chmelík
 Chornice
 Chotovice
 Chotěnov
 Chrastavec
 Čistá
 Desná
 Dlouhá Loučka
 Dolní Újezd
 Dětřichov
 Dětřichov u Moravské Třebové
 Gruna
 Hartinkov
 Hartmanice
 Horky
 Horní Újezd
 Hradec nad Svitavou
 Janov
 Janůvky
 Jaroměřice
 Jarošov
 Javorník
 Jedlová
 Jevíčko
 Kamenec u Poličky
 Kamenná Horka
 Karle
 Koclířov
 Korouhev
 Koruna
 Křenov
 Kukle
 Kunčina
 Květná
 Lavičné
 Linhartice
 Litomyšl
 Lubná
 Makov
 Malíkov
 Mikuleč
 Mladějov na Moravě
 Moravská Třebová
 Morašice
 Městečko Trnávka
 Nedvězí
 Němčice
 Nová Sídla
 Nová Ves u Jarošova
 Oldřiš
 Opatov
 Opatovec
 Osík
 Pohledy
 Polička
 Pomezí
 Poříčí u Litomyšle
 Pustá Kamenice
 Pustá Rybná
 Příluka
 Radiměř
 Radkov
 Řídký
 Rohozná
 Rozhraní
 Rozstání
 Rudná
 Rychnov na Moravě
 Sádek
 Sebranice
 Sedliště
 Široký Důl
 Sklené
 Slatina
 Sloupnice
 Staré Město
 Stašov
 Strakov
 Študlov
 Suchá Lhota
 Svitavy
 Svojanov
 Telecí
 Trpín
 Trstěnice
 Tržek
 Třebařov
 Újezdec
 Útěchov
 Vendolí
 Vidlatá Seč
 Víska u Jevíčka
 Vítějeves
 Vlčkov
 Vranová Lhota
 Vrážné
 Vysoká
 Želivsko

Gallery

References

External links
List of towns and villages of the Svitavy District

 
Districts of the Czech Republic